The University of Sharjah (also known as UOS) is an Emirati private 
national university located in University City, Sharjah, United Arab Emirates. It was established in October 1997 by its founder the ruler of Sharjah Sheikh Dr. Sultan bin Muhammad Al-Qasimi to meet the emirate of Sharjah's aim of educational needs. The university goals constitute of becoming a leading academic institution in the Middle East and around the world. In addition to its main campus in Sharjah City, the university has built campus facilities to provide education,training, and research programs directly to several communities throughout the emirate, GCC, Arab countries, and internationally. Most significantly, the university plays an important role in the socioeconomic development of the emirate of Sharjah.

The main campus for the university is located on the southern edge of Sharjah in University City, which is in close proximity to the Sharjah International Airport. The University of Sharjah extends its services through three branches located in different geographic areas in the emirate of Sharjah such as Khor Fakkan, Kalba, Al Dhaid.

History
The University of Sharjah was founded in October 1997 by Sheikh Dr. Sultan bin Muhammad Al-Qasimi, a member of the supreme council of the United Arab Emirates and the Ruler of Sharjah. The university was established as a result of Sheikh Sultan's vision of a distinctive institution in the emirate of Sharjah, based upon Islamic architecture and history and in order to meet the demand of the surrounding society, in particular of the UAE and the Middle East.

The Kalba campus, which had 100 million AED for construction expenditure, was inaugurated on February 28, 2011, in the city of Kalba by the president. Of the 100 million AED, 90 million went towards academic, scientific and administrative buildings and 10 million was spent on the outside campus and the surrounding area.

The Dhaid campus, which cost 60 million AED for construction expenditure, was inaugurated on December 17, 2015, by the president. It has 18 classrooms, four lecture rooms and 12 laboratories.

As part of the Medical & Health Sciences campus, the University Teaching Hospital and the University Teaching Dentistry Hospital were also inaugurated on June 11, 2011, by the president.

The Stock Market for Training virtual monitor was commenced on October 1, 2012. The monitor was set up by the Emirates Securities and Commodities Authority. The virtual monitor was made in a similar fashion to the Dubai Financial Market and the Abu Dhabi Securities Exchange virtual monitor's. The training stock market simulator was commenced on September 25, 2013, as part of a MoU between the university and ESCA.

On 24 March 2012, the three-floored library on the woman's campus was opened followed by opening a men's library in the Men's campus in the next year. Each library has been constructed on an area of more than 10,000 square meters and has the capacity to hold up to a million books. The inauguration of the library increased the total number of the university's libraries up to nine libraries.

In December 2021, the ruler of Sharjah appointed Sultan bin Ahmed Al Qasimi as President of the University of Sharjah.

Campus

Student center
There are two student centers around University city campus which are designed to house dean of student affairs office, student unions offices, offices for student clubs and societies, a fine arts room, a bookstore, branches for the Sharjah Cooperative Society and Sharjah Islamic Bank, and a number of small convenience commercial shops. Other services available in the student center include, barbershops, and various restaurants and coffee shops.

Dormitory
The University of Sharjah has two separate dormitories on University City campus which are under the supervision of the dormitory supervisors. The dormitory supervisors are required to prepare the annual plan for the dorms, draft reports with statistics, advertise and publish handouts, receive new students at the beginning of each semester, provide guidance to students, acquaint students with the dorm rules, regulations and other responsibilities, and are responsible to give their full attention to any students requiring medical attention. The Deanship of students affairs is responsible for organizing entertainment, sports events and weekly outings for all students living in the dorms.
 
The university offers students the choice from one, two and three-bedroom dorm rooms. Dorms are provided with clinics, study halls, computer labs, laundry facilities, garden areas, TV rooms, reception halls, and other areas for recreational activities.

Transportation
Transportation in the university is provided by a private transportation company that provides buses for students around various destinations in the emirate of Sharjah and around the United Arab Emirates. Students living in the dorms are provided with free bus transportation to the Medical and Health Sciences campus and to Fine Arts and Design campus. There is also free transportation from Sharjah and Al Dhaid to the university and vice versa. Recently, starting from Fall 2018/2019 semester they made transportation facilities even more easy for the inside campus delivering students between the buildings with specific times, drivers, and pickup location.to make students life easier all colleges are link together via air conditioned corridor.

Academics

The University of Sharjah offers the largest number of accredited programs in the United Arab Emirates. The university currently offers a total of 111 academic degree programs including 56 bachelor's degrees, 38 master's degrees, 15 PhD degrees, 2 diploma degrees. The university is fully licensed and all its programs are accredited by the Commission for Academic Accreditation (CAA) of the Ministry of Higher Education and Scientific Research in the United Arab Emirates.
All Engineering Programs are accredited by ABET
Bachelor of Science in Computer Science degree • Bachelor of Science in IT and Multimedia degree • Bachelor of Science in Chemistry • Bachelor of Science in Mathematics • Bachelor of Science in Biotechnology
are accredited internationally by ABET(Applied Science branch)
All Communication programs accredited by ACEJMC (Accrediting Council on Education in Journalism and Mass Communication) 
All College of Business Administration Programs are accredited by AACSB (International Accredilation).

Additionally, the Sharjah Surgical Institute (SSI), which is located in the Medical and Health Sciences campus and offers training program for surgeons from the region, was established with the cooperation of international partners, including Johnson and Johnson and Olympus. The Clinical Training Center (CTC) is accredited as a medical training and testing center by the: Royal College of Surgeons of England,   International Federation of Surgery and Obesity and Metabolic Disorders(IFSO),   European Association for Endoscopic Surgery (EAES), American Heart Association, and the Ministry of Health in United Arab Emirates.

University rankings

In 2021 UoS was ranked 658 in THE world ranking, climbing 100 positions from the 2020 ranking. UoS has secured its position among the top 201-250 in THE Young world universities as well as in THE Asian universities ranking. With these achievements UoS is ranked the third best university in UAE.
In THE Subjects rankings, UoS has achieved the best ranking in Clinical and Health to be among the top 10 Arab universities, second in UAE, and 251-300 globally. UoS has achieved the first place in the country in Computer Sciences, and 401-500 globally. In Engineering and Technology as well as Business and Economics, UoS was ranked 401-500 globally and the second and the third, respectively in the country. In Physical Sciences, UoS was ranked 501-600 globally and the second in the country.
</ref>

Student body
As of spring semester, 2020-2021 the university had an enrollment of 16,188 students: 14,277 undergraduate students and 1911 academic degree-seeking graduate students. Of all students, (36.0 percent) are Emirati nationals, (43.0 percent) are other Arabs, (11 percent) are GCC members, and (10 percent) are international students.

Research

As all research-led institutions around the world, the University of Sharjah (UOS) is totally committed to the advancement, discovery and support of high-quality research that addresses the major challenges of our times. 
Following The research institutes, departments and units are: 
- The Research Institute of Medical & Health Sciences (RIMHS) 
- The Research Institute of Sciences and Engineering (RISE) 
- The Research Institute for Humanities and Social Sciences (RIHSS) 
- The College of graduate studies 
- The Research Funding Department 
- The Scientific Publishing Unit 
- The Technology Transfer Office (TTO) 
- The Research Outreach Department

Nine centers of excellence in research are added to the institutes which are devoted to various projects and fields to meet the needs of the local community. 
</ref>

Medical education was introduced at the university with the rationale that the main “raison d’être” for a university is education in a broad sense and is a main focal point in the curriculum of the college of medicine. Medical education research utilizes the concept of Evidence-based medicine and translates the research into best available evidence in medical education.

In 2013, three students in the college of engineering submitted a new development of smart waste containers that has formed a collaboration between University of Sharjah and Dubai Municipality.

Athletics
The Sport Department regulates students participation in a variety of sports and other recreational activities in the University of Sharjah. The university is equipped with two separate sports centers designated one for males and the other for females, both of which are equipped with a swimming pool, sports hall, and gymnasium.

Some of the athletic activities organized by the Sport Department include swimming, volleyball, karate, shooting, aerobics, yoga, table tennis, chess, billiards, ground tennis, squash, football and basketball. The university awards students who excel in athletics grants and scholarships.

Notes

References

External links

Official website
Official UHS website
Official UDHS website

 
Education in the United Arab Emirates
Universities and colleges in Sharjah (city)
Educational institutions established in 1997
Sharjah (city)
University City of Sharjah
1997 establishments in the United Arab Emirates